Charlotte Ann Martin (born October 31, 1976) is an American singer-songwriter and voice coach, who performs predominantly on the piano. She has written several studio albums, two of which have received mainstream commercial releases, 2004's On Your Shore and 2006's Stromata. In 2009, she released an instrumental piano album titled Piano Trees before releasing her new studio album Dancing On Needles on February 1, 2011. On February 25, 2014, she released a new studio album, Water Breaks Stone.

Personal life
Martin grew up in Charleston, Illinois. She won the Miss Illinois Teen USA 1994 title on June 26, 1994 and went on to represent in the Miss Teen USA pageant broadcast live from Biloxi, Mississippi on August 16. Martin graduated from Eastern Illinois University (EIU) in 1998 with a bachelor's degree in vocal performance, majoring in opera. In 1999, Charlotte moved to Los Angeles. On September 30, 2005, she married musician/producer Ken Andrews. Their first child, Ronen Joseph Andrews, was born on May 4, 2008; their second, Stella Jean Andrews, was born on March 9, 2011.

Following the birth of Ronen, Martin suffered with the nerve disorder intercostal neuralgia that left her incapacitated for the better part of a year, causing lengthy delays to the writing and recording process of her album Dancing on Needles.

On August 11, 2017, Martin filed for divorce from Andrews.

Martin's father, Joseph Martin, is a music professor at Eastern Illinois University. Her mother, Becky Martin, is an administrator of a program for developmentally disabled adults.

Career

Pre-On Your Shore

Prior to the release of Martin's major-label debut On Your Shore, she had composed two full-length albums and two EPs. Her first foray into songwriting came in the form of Mystery, Magic & Seeds, an album Martin wrote as a result of a friend's death, which she now considers juvenilia, but is available for download from archive.org. Her second album, One Girl Army, remained unreleased, though an EP of the same name containing a few selections from the full-length album was released independently, and Martin still performs some of its content live. The masters for this record are now owned by Martin's former record label, RCA Records.

In 2002, Martin independently released a limited edition EP containing eight tracks called Test-Drive Songs, which is now out of print but still available for download at digital outlets including Martin's official site.

In 2003, Martin released another EP entitled In Parentheses on RCA. It contained four tracks, one of which ("Your Armor") would later be included (with an added string arrangement) on On Your Shore. A video for "Your Armor" was released later in the year.

On Your Shore 

On August 10, 2004, On Your Shore, Charlotte Martin's first full-length album on a major label, RCA, was released.  A video for the single, "Every Time It Rains", was also released.

To help promote the album, Martin toured on the "Chicks with Attitude" tour with Liz Phair, The Cardigans, and Katy Rose in the summer of 2004.

Darkest Hour and Veins 

Whilst touring, two EPs were released in preparation for Martin's second album Stromata, showcasing Charlotte's darker and more experimental sound. The first EP, Darkest Hour was available exclusively on her summer tour 2005 and included 6 tracks (including a cover of Depeche Mode's "Judas" and two remixes). The second EP, Veins, was pre-released on her 2005 fall tour and then released online in the November of that year.

On May 1, 2006, a DVD of live recordings, titled Something Like a DVD, was released via Musictoday.

Martin co-wrote and contributed vocals to "Glass Breaker", a song by The Crystal Method, released on the soundtrack for the Chris Evans/Jessica Biel movie London.

Stromata 

On September 12, 2006, Martin's second full-length album on a major label, Stromata, was released worldwide on her husband's (Ken Andrews) own label Dinosaur Fight Records. Two digital singles were released on iTunes and other outlets in the summer of 2006, containing four b-sides from the album. A third digital single was released early in 2007, also available on iTunes. A video for the single "Stromata" was released online and is available for purchase on online outlets. Two bonus tracks were also made exclusively available to iTunes, "Habit" and a remix of the title track. The album showcased a darker sound, with keyboards and other electronic instruments being predominant in the mix (as opposed to the more acoustic piano-based feel of previous records).

On May 1, 2007, Something Like a DVD was re-released as a DVD/CD dual package, including exclusive B-sides to Stromata and backstage footage surrounding the making of On Your Shore. The DVD is described as being the bridging piece between On Your Shore and Stromata by Martin's publicity releases.

Martin co-wrote and contributed vocals to the song "Sweet Things" on DJ Tiësto's 2007 album Elements of Life. She co-wrote and contributed vocals and piano to the song "Is This How Love's Supposed to Feel" on Ben Lee's 2007 album Ripe. She co-wrote and contributed vocals to the song "Feed the Monster" for BT. The original song was never released, but the remix by Blue Stahli was.

Orphans and Piano Trees 

On September 2, 2008, Martin confirmed the release of a new studio EP, Orphans. A video blog was posted several days later on September 8, revealing more details on the project, which contains B-sides and other material left off On Your Shore and Stromata (hence the EP name Orphans).  Most of the tracks are re-recorded or remastered, such as the Stromata B-side "Habit" and two tracks from her EP Test Drive Songs ("Many Rivers" and "Raven"). "Galaxies" and "Is This Called Desire" are two previously unheard tracks featured on the EP, along with old live fan favorite "The Stalker Song" (aka "I'm Normal, Please Date Me") appearing for the first time in studio form.

In a first for Martin, a contest was held for her fans to design the cover art for the EP. Orphans was released on November 11, 2008 and is available on iTunes in the United States.

In 2009, she released the instrumental album Piano Trees, a collection of improvised piano songs.

Dancing On Needles 
On February 1, 2011, Martin released her fourth album, Dancing on Needles. Produced by Ken Andrews (who had previously worked with Pete Yorn and Beck), the rapturous album traces Martin's heartbreaking struggle with intercostal neuralgia, a nerve disorder that left her incapacitated for much of the past year. "It was the most difficult period of my life," Martin stated. "The pain was excruciating. I saw countless doctors, was misdiagnosed countless times and prescribed countless medications. Nothing seemed to help. Forget about not being able to work; getting out of bed was a major undertaking. Worst of all, I couldn’t nurse, or even lift, my baby. As a new mother, that was devastating".

The album was released on Martin's Test-Drive Records and was preceded by the single "Volcano". Martin's official website announced the video for the single, available exclusively on YouTube on the same day the album was released digitally.

Water Breaks Stone 
On February 25, 2014, Charlotte Martin released Water Breaks Stone. Shortly before announcing its release, Martin made a Facebook post asking her followers to guess the name of the album by unscrambling a set of letters.

Rapture 
On March 27, 2017, Charlotte Martin announced that she would no longer be touring: "At this point in my life, it’s not possible for me to mount any long tours or even short ones. I’ve chosen to be a Mommy and that’s my first priority. I still plan to be involved in music though and will do one-offs here and there if the timing’s right... [T]his is right for me and my family." She held a farewell tour between March and May, and released Rapture on May 12, 2017.

Clear Blue Sky, Monotonous Night and Dawn 
On October 5, 2018, Charlotte Martin released the second of her instrumental piano albums (after Piano Trees), entitled Clear Blue Sky. The following year, in 2019, two more albums in a similar vein were released: Monotonous Night on March 8 and Dawn on December 27.

Discography
A complete list of Martin's discography is available on her official site.

Albums
 Mystery, Magic & Seeds (1998)
 Solo (2000)
 One Girl Army (2001)
 On Your Shore (2004)
 Stromata (2006)
 Reproductions (2007)
 Piano Trees (2009)
 Dancing on Needles (2011)
 Hiding Places (2012)
 Water Breaks Stone (2014)
 Rapture (2017)
 Clear Blue Sky (2018)
 Monotonous Night (2019)
 Dawn (2019)

Singles

EPs
 One Girl Army (2002)
 Test-Drive Songs (2002)
 In Parentheses (2003)
 Darkest Hour (2005)
 Veins (2005)
 Stromata (EP version) (2006)
 Rarities #1-#6 (2006–2009)
 Orphans (2008)

DVDs
 Something Like a DVD (2005, re-released in 2007 as Dual DVD/CD set with B-Sides from On Your Shore and Stromata.)
 "Hiding Places" (2012 Dual DVD/CD, live show and documentary plus 8 b-sides)

Additional credits
Martin's song "Beautiful Life" from On Your Shore appears in the Maxis computer game The Sims 2: University (The Sims 2 expansion pack), translated into the game's fictional language of Simlish. "Keep Me in Your Pocket" from Stromata appears in the same fashion in The Sims 2: Bon Voyage.
Martin co-wrote and recorded "Glass Breaker" with The Crystal Method.  The song appears on the London Movie Soundtrack.
Martin has released six "rarity" EPs, called the Rarities series, available for purchase only at live shows. These contain previously unreleased or hard-to-find material, and sparked something of a scavenger hunt among fans due to their limited availability. One of the songs featured, "Cool Killer," is home-recorded and features Martin scolding her dog Hugo in the background.
Martin's voice is featured on the Mae album The Everglow, in the tracks "Prologue" and "Epilogue."
Martin is the vocalist/pianist and a co-writer in the song "Greater Lights" on the soundtrack of the video game Advent Rising.
Martin recorded "Bring On the Day" for the film Sweet Home Alabama starring Reese Witherspoon in 2002, and the song is featured in the opening sequence of the movie. The song can also be found on the soundtrack to the film.
Martin is credited with additional vocals on the song "Inhuman" by Thousand Foot Krutch, from their album The Flame in All of Us.
Martin's songs "Veins" (from the Veins EP), "The Dance" (from Stromata) and "Wild Horses" (from On Your Shore) were used during the third, fourth and ninth seasons respectively of the hit television show So You Think You Can Dance.
Martin co-wrote and played piano for the song "Is This How Love's Supposed to Feel" on the Ben Lee album Ripe.
Martin co-wrote and sang "Sweet Things" on the 2007 Tiësto album Elements of Life.

References

External links

 Official website
 Charlotte Martin collection on the Internet Archive's live music archive
 Charlotte Martin live on WOXY.com, April 4, 2006
 Charlotte Martin live on WOXY.com, November 3, 2006

1976 births
Living people
American women singer-songwriters
Eastern Illinois University alumni
Singer-songwriters from Illinois
1994 beauty pageant contestants
20th-century Miss Teen USA delegates
People from Charleston, Illinois
21st-century American singers
21st-century American women singers
20th-century American people